Sound BlasterAxx is a series of USB powered speakers that has the features of a sound card. The speakers also have built-in microphones. The series of speakers work with Mac OS X other than Microsoft Windows.

Sound BlasterAxx SBX Series
The Sound BlasterAxx SBX series was released in year 2012. There are three models in the series the Sound BlasterAxx SBX 8, Sound BlasterAxx SBX 10 and Sound BlasterAxx SBX 20. All three speakers have a bass port, Headphone Out and Aux-in/Mic-in 3.5mm jacks behind. The speakers do not contain rechargeable batteries and they require a USB power source.

The speakers work with the Sound BlasterAxx Control Panel software for adjustment of SBX Pro Studio and Crystal Voice settings. The Sound BlasterAxx Control Panel has got a Mac OS X version other than the Microsoft Windows version.

The Sound BlasterAxx SBX 8 is the only speaker that does not have Bluetooth capability.
The Sound BlasterAxx SBX 10 and Sound BlasterAxx SBX 20 are Bluetooth capable and can be used for answering phones calls from iOS and Android smart phones. The Bluetooth version for the speakers is Bluetooth 2.1(Enhanced Data Rate). The Bluetooth codecs supported are SBC and AAC, aptX is not supported. The speakers also do not support ASIO and do not have the Scout Mode feature.

SBX Pro Studio effects such as SBX Surround, SBX Crystallizer, SBX Bass, SBX Smart Volume and SBX Dialog Plus can be adjusted by the Sound Blaster Central mobile app.

Sound BlasterAxx AXX 200

In the beginning of 2014, Creative Labs released the Sound BlasterAxx AXX 200 portable Bluetooth speaker.

Like the speakers of the Sound BlasterAxx SBX series, it has a built-in SB-Axx1 sound chip and works with both Mac OS X and Microsoft Windows computers. Its dimensions are 64.0 x 72.3 x 200.6 mm (2.51 x 2.84 x 7.9 inches) and it weighs 0.5 kg (1.1 lbs).

The Sound BlasterAxx AXX 200 has a built-in 5200mAh Lithium-ion battery, allowing it to be used as a portable Bluetooth speaker. It has a microSD card slot for playing WMA/MP3 tracks from a microSD card. Calls and voices can be recorded through its microphone; the recordings are stored in the microSD card. It also has a megaphone function.

Its Bluetooth version is Bluetooth 2.1(Enhanced Date Rate) and supports SBC, AAC and aptX Bluetooth codecs. It can be paired with Bluetooth devices via NFC(Near Field Communication).

Same as the Sound BlasterAxx SBX series of speakers, it does not support ASIO and does not have the Scout Mode feature.

See also
 Sound Blaster

References

External links
 Sound BlasterAxx Press Release - Creative Technology Sound BlasterAxx Press Release
 Sound BlasterAxx Axx 200 Press Release - Creative Technology Sound BlasterAxx Press Release

Creative Technology products